Antonio Monteiro is the name of:

António Monteiro (politician) (born 1944), former foreign minister of Portugal
 António Mascarenhas Monteiro (1944–2016), former President of Cape Verde
 Antônio Monteiro Dutra (born 1973), Brazilian footballer
António Monteiro (canoeist) (born 1972), Portuguese sprint canoer
António Isaac Monteiro, former foreign minister of Guinea-Bissau
Antônio Monteiro (actor) (born 1956), Brazilian actor, director and writer
Antonio Monteiro (mathematician) (1907–1980), mathematician born in Portuguese Angola